Saba Yoi (Pattani Malay: บายอ) is the southeasternmost district (amphoe) of Songkhla province, southern Thailand.

Etymology
The name Saba Yoi is a Thai corruption of sebayu (Jawi: سبايو). Its original name means 'wind' in Malay.

History
The area of Saba Yoi was administered by the Thepha district. It was upgraded to be Ba Hoi minor district (king amphoe) in 1924. In 1942 the government moved the district office to Tambon Mong and renamed the minor district Saba Yoi. It was upgraded to a full district in 1956.

Geography
Neighboring districts are (from the west clockwise): Na Thawi and Thepha of Songkhla Province; Khok Pho of Pattani province; Mueang Yala, Yaha, and Kabang of Yala province. To the southwest is the state Kedah of Malaysia.

San Kala Khiri National Park is in Saba Yoi.

Administration
The district is divided into nine sub-districts (tambons), which are further subdivided into 62 villages (mubans). Saba Yoi is also a sub-district municipality (thesaban tambon) which covers parts of tambon Saba Yai.

References

External links
amphoe.com (Thai)
 San Kala Khiri National Park

Districts of Songkhla province